Moscavide is a station on the Red Line of the Lisbon Metro. The station is in the parish of Moscavide in the Municipality of Loures, bordering Lisbon, and is located in Rua João Pinto Ribeiro beside Estádio Alfredo Marques Augusto.

The station, designed by the architect Manuel Bastos, opened in July 2012 in conjunction with the Encarnação and Aeroporto stations, as part of the expansion of the line to serve Lisbon Portela Airport.

Connections

Urban buses

Carris 
 705 Estação Oriente (Interface) ⇄ Estação Roma-Areeiro
 725 Estação Oriente (Interface) ⇄ Prior Velho - Rua Maestro Lopes Graça
 728 Restelo - Av. das Descobertas ⇄ Portela - Av. dos Descobrimentos
 731 Av. José Malhoa ⇄ Moscavide Centro
 759 Restauradores ⇄ Estação Oriente (Interface)
 782 Cais do Sodré ⇄ Praça José Queirós

Suburban buses

Rodoviária de Lisboa 
 301 Lisboa (Estação Oriente) ⇄ Loures (Zona Comercial) via Hospital
 302 Lisboa (Praça José Queirós) ⇄ Bairro de Santiago
 303 Rodinhas de Moscavide (circular)
 309 Lisboa (Estação Oriente) ⇄ Cabeço de Aguieira
 310 Lisboa (Estação Oriente) ⇄ Charneca do Lumiar
 316 Lisboa (Estação Oriente) ⇄ Santa Iria da Azóia
 317 Lisboa (Estação Oriente) ⇄ Bairro da Covina
 318 Lisboa (Estação Oriente) ⇄ Portela da Azóia
 750 Lisboa (Estação Oriente) circulação via Bairro das Coroas e Unhos

See also
 List of Lisbon metro stations

References

External links

Red Line (Lisbon Metro) stations
Railway stations opened in 2012